A Romance of Seville is a 1929 British drama film directed by Norman Walker and starring Alexander D'Arcy, Marguerite Allan and Cecil Barry. This was the first British sound film released in colour, using the Pathéchrome stencil-colouring process. The film is also known by the alternative title The Romance of Seville.

Cast
 Alexander D'Arcy as Ramon
 Marguerite Allan as Pepita
 Randle Ayrton as Estavian
 Cecil Barry as Estaban
 Hugh Eden as Juan
 Eugenie Amami as Dolores

See also
List of early color feature films
List of lost films

References

Bibliography
 Mundy, John. The British musical film. Manchester University Press, 2007.

External links
 

1929 films
1920s color films
British drama films
1929 drama films
Films shot at British International Pictures Studios
1920s English-language films
Films directed by Norman Walker
British black-and-white films
1920s British films